A work song is a song about human labor.

Work Song may also refer to:

 "Work Song", a song by Charles Mingus on the 1955 album Mingus at the Bohemia
 "Work Song", a song by Don Patterson on the 1966 album Goin' Down Home
 Work Song (Nat Adderley album), a 1960 album
 "Work Song" (Nat Adderley song), the title track from the album
 "Work Song" (Bill Laswell song), a song by Laswell from the 1983 album Baselines
 "Work Song" (Hozier song), a 2014 song
 Work Song: Three Views of Frank Lloyd Wright, a 2000 play
 "Work Song", a 1990 song and music video by Corbin/Hanner
 "The Work Song", a song from the 1950 Disney film Cinderella
 Work Song, a 2010 novel by Ivan Doig
 "Happy Working Song", a song from the 2007 Disney film Enchanted

See also
 Work Song: Three Views of Frank Lloyd Wright, a 2000 play by Jeffrey Hatcher and Eric Simonson
 Work Song: Live at Sweet Basil, a 1990 album by Nat Adderley's Quintet